I, Davros: Innocence is a Big Finish Productions audio drama based on the long-running British science fiction television series Doctor Who. It stars Terry Molloy reprising his role as Davros, the twisted creator of the Dalek race. "Innocence" is the first in a four-part mini-series exploring Davros' early life on Skaro. According to Gary Russell, the title is an allusion to the drama  I, Claudius.

Cast list
Davros – Terry Molloy
Dalek Voices – Nicholas Briggs
Councillor Quested – [Sean Connolly]
Tashek – Rita Davies
Colonel Nasgard – Richard Franklin
Major Brogan – Richard Grieve
Major Brint – James Parsons
Kaled Officer – Scott Handcock
Yarvell – Lizzie Hopley
Young Davros – Rory Jennings
Lady Calcula – Carolyn Jones
Tutor Magrantine – Peter Sowerbutts

Plot
On Skaro, Davros is brought before the Daleks on a trial basis. The Daleks have been failing in their conquests and a schism has arisen; they need Davros to help. He thinks back to his teenage years during the Kaled/Thal war from Genesis of the Daleks...

Davros is a sixteen-year-old Kaled from a wealthy family. His father, Colonel Nasgard, wants him to join the military, but his ambitious mother, Calcula, wants him to become a scientist. She has arranged for Tutor Magrantine to give him extra-curricular lessons. Davros is not pleased, preferring to spend his days at Drammankin Lake near the family home, studying the life-forms there. His older sister, Yarvell, is soon to join the Military Youth and considers Davros spoiled.

Nasgard is killed by a mysterious bomb. This is blamed on the pacifist Major Brogan, who is scapegoated as a Thal spy. Magrantine confronts Davros during lessons - Nasgard was indirectly responsible for the death of Magrantine's son. He attempts to kill Davros in revenge, but Davros locks him in a radioactive chamber.

It is revealed that Nasgard is not Davros' father - he's the result of an affair between Calcula and Councillor Quested. Davros kills Quested upon finding out, much to his mother's relief. As the flashback comes to an end, a Thal missile attack begins on the city.

Back in the present, the Daleks point out that Davros was an inferior being at this point, a mere child. Davros asserts he was more of a man than his fellow Kaleds and it would be years before he would be recognised by the 'spineless' Kaled government.

Continuity
 For Davros, the bookended trial scenes take place just after being seized by the Daleks at the end of Revelation of the Daleks. It's possible these scenes could even be related to The Davros Mission.

References

External links
Big Finish Productions – I, Davros: Innocence
BBC Norfolk – Watch interview with Terry Molloy discussing I Davros – November '06

2006 audio plays
Innocence